Hasasaneh-ye Bala (also Romanized as Ḩasāsaneh-ye Bālā; also known as Ḩasāsaneh-ye Yek) is a village in Bani Saleh Rural District, Neysan District, Hoveyzeh County, Khuzestan Province, Iran. At the 2006 census, its population was 202, in 24 families.

References 

Populated places in Hoveyzeh County